Crusade Records is an independent record label based in Sydney, Australia. Founded in 2005, the label houses Australian and international bands in metal, hardcore and rock genres. The label has, in its existence, signed Through Closed Eyes, The Valley, The Mission In Motion, Freestate, and The Rabble. The label has also put out releases, under licence from respective labels, by Bring Me The Horizon, Deadsoil, Trivium, and Drop Dead, Gorgeous.
In 2008, due to the closure of Modern Music, the label has been without distribution. The label is currently doing In-House Distribution.

Current artists
The Rabble

Releases 
The Rabble - The Battle's Almost Over
Freestate - Surrender
The Mission in Motion - The Window
Bloodlined Calligraphy - Ypsilanti
The Valley - Burning at the Mistake
Drop Dead, Gorgeous - In Vogue
The Valley -  A Small Misunderstanding Leads to Disaster
Deadsoil - The Venom Divine
Trivium - Ember to Inferno
Bring Me the Horizon -  This Is What the Edge of Your Seat Was Made For
Through Closed Eyes -   With Every Breath

See also
 List of record labels

References

External links 

Crusade Records on Myspace

Australian independent record labels
Heavy metal record labels
Hardcore record labels